Juri Knorr (born 9 May 2000 in Flensburg) is a German handball player for Rhein-Neckar Löwen and the German national team.

Career

Clubs 
Knorr started playing handball in the Mini-Mix from VfL Bad Schwartau. He later joined MTV Lübeck. In addition, he played football for VfL Bad Schwartau and VfB Lübeck until 2015. Knorr returned to VfL Bad Schwartau, where he played in the A-Jugend-Bundesliga. He left VfL in 2017, at the age of 17, and joined HSG Ostsee N / G, which was trained by his father Thomas Knorr.

In 2018 he moved to FC Barcelona, playing for their second division team. In December 2018 he made his debut in FC Barcelona's top team, where he played a total of 6 games. In 2019 he signed for the German Handball-Bundesliga club GWD Minden. Since 2021 he's playing for Rhein-Neckar Löwen.

National team
With Germany he participated in the European Men's U-18 Handball Championship in 2018, and was awarded a place in the All-Star team as the best left back. He made his debut for the senior national team in November 2020.

Individual awards
Best young player of the World Championship: 2023

References

External links
Juri Knorr on EHF's website

German male handball players
Rhein-Neckar Löwen players
Handball-Bundesliga players
People from Flensburg
2000 births
Living people
Handball players at the 2020 Summer Olympics
Sportspeople from Schleswig-Holstein